Statistics of Swedish football Division 3 for the 1942–43 season.

League standings

Uppsvenska Sydöstra 1942–43

Uppsvenska Sydvästra 1942–43

Östsvenska Norra 1942–43

Östsvenska Södra 1942–43

Centralserien Norra 1942–43

Centralserien Södra 1942–43

Nordvästra Norra 1942–43

Nordvästra Södra, Dalsland 1942–43

Nordvästra Södra, Bohus 1942–43

Mellansvenska Norra 1942–43

Mellansvenska Södra 1942–43

Sydöstra Norra 1942–43

Sydöstra Södra 1942–43

Västsvenska Norra 1942–43

Västsvenska Södra 1942–43

Sydsvenska Norra 1942–43

Sydsvenska Södra 1942–43

Footnotes

References 

Swedish Football Division 3 seasons
3
Swed